LaQuan Williams (born June 27, 1988) is a former American football wide receiver. He played college football at the University of Maryland. He was signed by the Baltimore Ravens as an undrafted free agent in 2011. He has also played for the New England Patriots.

Early life
Williams was born on June 27, 1988 in Baltimore, Maryland. He attended the Baltimore Polytechnic Institute where he played on the football team as a quarterback and safety and on the basketball team as a shooting guard. In football, Williams won three varsity letters and started for two seasons. He caught 10 interceptions each in both his junior and senior seasons. In his final year, he gained 804 rushing yards, six rushing touchdowns, 630 passing yards, seven passing touchdowns, and returned two punts and a kickoff for touchdowns. The Baltimore Sun named him a second-team All-City player as a junior and a first-team All-City defensive back as a senior. In basketball, Williams was a four-year letter winner and averaged over 20.0 points per game. Williams was recruited by Maryland, Virginia, Virginia Tech, and James Madison.

College career
Williams attended the University of Maryland, where he majored in American studies. He sat out his freshman season as a redshirt. During the 2007 season, he split time at the Z-receiver position with Isaiah Williams. Against No. 10 Rutgers, backup quarterback Chris Turner connected with Williams on two passes for 66 yards. Williams caught a spectacular diving reception for 27 yards that set up a score by running back Keon Lattimore for a 34–24 victory. After the game against No. 8 Boston College, Williams suffered a season ending MCL sprain during practice. The Sporting News named him to its ACC All-Freshman Team.

During the 2008 season, Williams was limited to action in three games as a reserve because of a foot injury. He was declared academically ineligible in early February 2009, but regained eligibility in time for spring practice and the 2009 season. He played in all 12 games including one as a starter. Against Rutgers, Williams caught a 24-yard touchdown pass.

Before the 2010 season, Williams beat out teammate Ronnie Tyler for the starting slot receiver position. He saw action in all 13 games, including three starts. Williams had twelve tackles on special teams and at the end of the season earned the special teams captain award. Against Wake Forest, Williams blocked a punt.

Professional career

Baltimore Ravens
The Baltimore Ravens signed Williams as an undrafted free agent in 2011. In his first preseason game against the Philadelphia Eagles, he made three catches for 46 yards and was the team's second leading receiver behind tight end Dennis Pitta. Because of injury to Lee Evans, Williams played several games of the 2011 season as the Ravens' third receiver, including the Sunday Night Football matchup which saw the team sweep their heated rival Pittsburgh Steelers, in which he notched two big receptions for first downs. Along with time at receiver, he was also a special teams standout, recording 4 tackles in his rookie season while also returning 5 kicks for 109 yards on a 21.8 yard average in 2011. He also finished with four special teams tackles.

During the team's Super Bowl run in 2012, Williams saw no snaps on offense but collected five tackles on special teams. On September 1, 2013, the Ravens waived him.

New England Patriots
The New England Patriots signed Williams to a one-year contract on November 5, 2013. Ten days later, he was released by the New England Patriots on November 15, 2013.

Second and Third stints with Ravens

On April 24, 2014, Williams re-signed with the Baltimore Ravens. The Ravens released Williams on August 25, 2014.

On December 3, 2014, Williams was re-signed to the Ravens' practice squad. The Ravens released him just six days later.

2015 NFL Veteran Combine
Williams participated in the first NFL Veteran Combine in 2015.

Saskatchewan Roughriders
On September 29, 2015, Williams was signed to the Saskatchewan Roughriders's practice squad. On June 19, 2016, Williams was cut by the Roughriders.

Los Angeles KISS
On July 14, 2016, Williams was assigned to the Los Angeles KISS.

Baltimore Brigade
Williams was assigned to the Baltimore Brigade on January 30, 2017.

References

External links

 Maryland Terrapins bio
 Baltimore Ravens bio

1988 births
Living people
American football wide receivers
Baltimore Brigade players
Baltimore Ravens players
Los Angeles Kiss players
Maryland Terrapins football players
New England Patriots players
Saskatchewan Roughriders players
Baltimore Polytechnic Institute alumni
Players of American football from Baltimore